The Other Europe, whose full name was The Other Europe with Tsipras (L'Altra Europa con Tsipras, AET), was a left-wing political organisation in Italy. It took part in the 2014 European Parliament election in support of Alexis Tsipras, the candidate of the Party of the European Left for President of the European Commission.

History
In the 2014 EP election the list obtained 4.0% of the vote, just above the 4% threshold, and 3 elects to the European Parliament: Eleonora Forenza (Communist Refoundation Party), Curzio Maltese (independent, later Left Ecology Freedom) and Barbara Spinelli (independent). After the election, they joined the European United Left–Nordic Green Left (GUE/NGL) Group. In May 2015 Spinelli left AET, becoming an independent MEP within GUE/NGL.

In July 2015 two senators, Fabrizio Bocchino and Francesco Campanella, elected in the 2013 general election with the Five Star Movement and later founding members of the short-lived Italy Work in Progress party, launched a sub-group named "The Other Europe with Tsipras" within the Mixed Group of the Senate. In March 2016 the sub-group was folded into Italian Left, which had been launched primarily by Left Ecology Freedom and dissidents of the Democratic Party.

Composition
AET was founded on 5 March 2014 in Rome by some Italian intellectuals, Andrea Camilleri, Paolo Flores d'Arcais, Luciano Gallino, Marco Revelli, Barbara Spinelli and Guido Viale. The alliance was then composed of the following parties:

Leadership

Chairman
Massimo Torelli (05/03/2014–present)

Advisory Committee
Current members:
Marco Revelli (01/02/2014–present)
Argyris Panagopoulos, in name of Alexis Tsipras (08/02/2014–present)
Massimo Torelli (01/02/2014–present)
Former members:
Andrea Camilleri (01/02/2014–11/03/2014)
Paolo Flores d'Arcais (01/02/2014–11/03/2014)
Luciano Gallino (01/02/2014–08/11/2015)
Barbara Spinelli (01/02/2014–15/05/2015)
Guido Viale (01/02/2014–18/03/2015)

Electoral results

European Parliament

Regional Councils

References

External links
Official website

2014 establishments in Italy
2019 disestablishments in Italy
Communist Refoundation Party
Defunct left-wing political party alliances
Defunct political party alliances in Italy
Political parties established in 2014
Political parties disestablished in 2019
Italy
Alexis Tsipras